Chainsaw Charlie may be:
"Chainsaw Charlie (Murders in the New Morgue)", a song by W.A.S.P. from their 1992 album The Crimson Idol
Ring name of American professional wrestler Terry Funk